"Light It Up" is a song by American electronic music producing group Major Lazer, featuring vocals from Jamaican singer Nyla, which appears on Major Lazer's third studio album Peace Is the Mission. A remixed dancehall version of the song, to which additional vocals from British-Ghanaian Afrobeats artist Fuse ODG were added, was included on a re-released version of Peace Is the Mission and released as the album's third single overall on November 5, 2015.

Chart performance
The song attained international success in Europe and Oceania. It also marks Nyla's and ODG's highest-charting single to date. On the Billboard Hot 100 the song debuted at 98 and has peaked at number 73, marking Nyla's and ODG's first entry on the chart.

Remixes
On March 12, 2016, an Italian version of the song was released, featuring vocals from Italian singer and songwriter Baby K.

Music video
Method Studios design team created the film that opened the 2016 AICP Show, developing the concept of a character that embodied creativity; dancing avatars created with procedural art. Artists developed 50 texture effects and custom algorithms to execute them and a CG environment with lighting and camera setups and textures. The film was then re-cut to a new track, Major Lazer's “Light it Up” and posted online, where it garnered 100M+ views, drove downloads of the song and views for the artists, and went on to be recognized with awards, significant media coverage and re-posting worldwide.

Charts

Weekly charts

Year-end charts

Certifications

Release history

References

2015 songs
2015 singles
UK Independent Singles Chart number-one singles
Major Lazer songs
Fuse ODG songs
Song recordings produced by Diplo
Songs written by Diplo
Reggae fusion songs
Songs written by Jr Blender
Songs written by Sidney Swift